The women's singles badminton tournament at the 2020 Summer Olympics took place from 24 July to 1 August at the Musashino Forest Sport Plaza at Tokyo. A total of 43 players from 37 nations competed.

The event was won by China's Chen Yufei who defeated reigning World Number 1 Tai Tzu-ying of Chinese Taipei in the final. Reigning World Champion and 2016 Rio Olympics silver medalist P. V. Sindhu of India won the bronze medal, defeating China's He Bingjiao in the playoff. This was India's third consecutive medal in this discipline, and Chinese Taipei's first.

Background
This was the 8th appearance of the event as a full medal event. Badminton was introduced as a demonstration sport in 1972, held again as an exhibition sport in 1988, and added to the full programme in 1992.

The reigning champion was Carolina Marín of Spain. Marín was the 4th-ranked player during the qualifying period and would have qualified to return, but withdrew due to an injury. The other two medalists from 2016, silver medalist P. V. Sindhu of India and bronze medalist Nozomi Okuhara of Japan, both qualified with Top-10 rankings. P. V. Sindhu was also the reigning world champion and the only one of the three former Olympic medalists to be medalled again where she won the bronze medal.

Qualification

The badminton qualification system was designed to ensure that 86 men and 86 women receive quota spots; the size of the women's singles field adjusts to hit that target quota. Following revisions due to the COVID-19 pandemic, the qualifying periods were set between 29 April 2019 to 15 March 2020 and 4 January to 13 June 2021, with the ranking list of 15 June 2021 deciding qualification.

There were 38 initial quota places for the women's singles: 34 from the ranking list, 3 from Tripartite Commission invitations, and 1 host nation place. Nations with multiple players in the top 16 of the ranking list could earn 2 quota places; all others were limited to 1. Players were taken from the ranking list in order, respecting the national limits, until the places were filled. Each continent was guaranteed one spot, either through the invitational spots or by replacing the lowest-ranked player if necessary. The host nation spot was unnecessary (Japan qualified two players through the ranking list) and was reallocated to the ranking list.

Additional places beyond 38 were added where players qualified in both the women's singles and one of the doubles events. This resulted in 5 additional places added to the ranking list. One tripartite invitational place was not used. The total qualified list was thus 43 players.

Competition format
The tournament was started with a group phase round-robin followed by a knockout stage. For the group stage, the players were divided into between 12 and 16 groups of between 3 and 4 players each. Each group was played in a round-robin. Players finishing top in each group advanced to the knockout rounds. The knockout stage was a four-round single elimination tournament with a bronze medal match. If there were fewer than 16 groups in the group stage, some players would receive a bye in the round of 16.

Matches were played best-of-three games. Each game was played to 21, except that a player must win by 2 unless the score reached 30–29.

Schedule
The tournament was held over a 10-day period, with 9 competition days and a 1 open day.

Seeds
A total of 14 players were given seeds.

{{flagIOCathlete|Chen Yufei|CHN|2020 Summer}} (gold medalist)
 (silver medalist)
 (quarter-finals)
 (quarter-finals)
 (quarter-finals)
 (bronze medalist)
 (quarter-finals)

<li> (fourth place)
<li> (round of 16)
<li> (round of 16)
<li> (round of 16)
<li> (round of 16)
<li> (round of 16)
<li> (round of 16)

Group stage
The group stage was played from 24 to 28 July. The winner of each group advanced to the knockout rounds.

Group A

Group C

Group D

Group E

Group F

Group G

Group H

Group I

Group J

Group K

Group L

Group M

Group N

Group P

Finals
The knockout stage was played from 29 July to 1 August. One round was held per day. This stage was a single-elimination tournament with a bronze medal match.

References

External links
Group play 

Badminton at the 2020 Summer Olympics
Women's events at the 2020 Summer Olympics